The MAAC Defensive Player of the Year was an annual award given out at the conclusion of the Metro Atlantic Athletic Conference regular season to the best defensive men's ice hockey player in the conference as voted by the coaches of each MAAC team.

The award was discontinued after 2002-03 when the MAAC ice hockey conference was dissolved and all remaining programs reformed in Atlantic Hockey.

Award winners

Winners by school

See also
Atlantic Hockey Regular Season Goaltending Award
MAAC Awards

References

External links
2001-02 MAAC Regular Season Award Winners

College ice hockey trophies and awards in the United States
College ice hockey goaltender awards in the United States